Germany's Next Topmodel, cycle 12 is the twelfth cycle of Germany's Next Topmodel. It aired on ProSieben from February to May 2017.

The prizes included a modeling contract worth €140,000 with ONEeins fab Management, a spread and cover in the German Cosmopolitan, a €100,000 cash prize and an Opel Adam. Thomas Hayo and Michael Michalsky returned for their spots as judges, the teams and battle concept remained. International destinations are set in Barcelona, Menorca, Majorca, Paris, Marseille, Los Angeles, New York City, Las Vegas and London.

The winner of this season was 18-year-old Céline Bethmann from Koblenz.

Contestants
(ages stated are at start of contest)

Episode summaries

Episode 1: Ein Flughafen für #GNTM 
Original airdate: 

The twelfth season of Germany's Next Top Model started with a casting where thousands of girls had applied. Only a few managed to move on to the next round. Afterwards, the girls had to prove themselves a second time and run on a treadmill before the jury. Céline, Deborah, Greta and Leticia got a ticket immediately. At the end of the week the girls had to lay down a walk in elegant dresses. Only 28 girls made it to the next week.

Episode 2: Die Topmodel-Cruise beginnt 

This week's challenge was to make a photo with a self|timer. The better one won a point for their team. The challenge was won by Team Michael. This week's photoshoot was a paddleboardingshoot in bikinis. After the photoshoot Heidi decided to throw Christina and Saskia out for their bad performances at the shoot. At elimination, Elisa was eliminated for being too young and Victoria for her bad performance at photoshoot and runway.

Challenge winner: Team Michael
Eliminated outside of judging panel: Christina Wiessner & Saskia Mächler 
Best photo: Giuliana Radermacher & Julia Fux
Eliminated: Elisa Weihmann & Victoria Wanke
Featured photographer: Max Montgomery

Episode 3: Ein Shooting in extremen Höhen 

The girls had a photoshoot on a box at dizzying heights. Afterwards, Heidi announced that Claudia is out. At elimination, Milena was eliminated for her worse performance at the photoshoot, Chaline for being to young and Kimberly for her bad performance at both, runway and photoshoot.

Best photo: Carina Zavline
Shoot out: Claudia Fiedler & Neele Bronst
Eliminated outside of judging panel: Claudia Fiedler 
Eliminated: Chaline Bang, Kimberly Pereira	& Milena Ziller
Featured photographer: Max Montgomery
Special guests: Mac Folkes & Nikeata Thompson

Episode 4: Das große Umstyling

This week was the big makeover. Helena refused her makeover and decided to quit the competition. This week's photoshoot was the sedcard shoot. After the shoot Aissatou was eliminated outside of judging panel. At elimination, Deborah, Julia, Lynn, Melina, Neele and Sabine landed in the bottom six. In the end, Deborah was eliminated for her weak week.

Quit: Helena Fritz
Shoot out: Aissatou Niang & Brenda Hübscher
Eliminated outside of judging panel: Aissatou Niang
Bottom six: Deborah Lay, Julia Fux, Lynn Petertonkoker, Melina Budde, Neele Bronst & Sabine Fischer
Eliminated: Deborah Lay  
Featured photographer: Brian Bowen Smith

Episode 5: Challenges in der Wüste 

This week's photoshoot was a Desert shoot. Carina, Céline, Maja and Serlina were booked for a casting. Céline was booked for the job. At elimination, Melina and Sabine landed in the bottom two. In the end, Melina was eliminated.

Booked for job: Céline Bethmann
Bottom two: Melina Budde & Sabine Fischer
Eliminated: Melina Budde  
Featured photographer: Kristian Schuller
Special guests: Nadine Leopold, Mac Folkes, Nikeata Thompson & Christina Hammer

Episode 6: Als Burlesque Girls in Las Vegas 

Carina, Giuliana and Greta were invited for a casting in Paris. Greta was booked for the job. This week's challenge was to pose in groups in front of a car is driving. This challenge was won by Team Michael. The photoshoot this week was a burlesque shoot. At elimination, Giuliana and Neele landed in the bottom two. In the end, Heidi decided to eliminate Neele from the competition.
 
Booked for job: Greta Faeser   
Challenge winner: Team Michael
Best photo: Brenda Hübscher 
Bottom two: Giuliana Radermacher & Neele Bronst
Eliminated: Neele Bronst
Featured photographer: Ellen von Unwerth
Special guests: Felix Schmitt

Episode 7: Sexy Graffiti Shooting  

This week's challenge was to dance a choreography in groups. This challenge was won by Serlina. Anh, Greta, Lynn and Sabine were booked for a casting and Sabine was booked for the job. This week's photoshoot was a nude graffiti shoot. At elimination, Giuliana and Julia F. landed in the bottom two and Julia F. was the next to leave the competition.

Booked for job: Sabine Fischer
Challenge winner: Serlina Hohmann
Bottom two: Giuliana Radermacher & Julia Fux
Eliminated: Julia Fux
Featured photographer: Christian Anwander
Special guests: Mac Folkes & Nikeata Thompson

Episode 8: Der harte Kampf um Jobs 

 
The models flew to Berlin at Berlin Fashion Week. Anh, Brenda, Carina, Romina, Sabine and Serlina were booked for a job. Before the photoshoot Greta decided to quit the competition. This week's photoshoot was to pose with their mentors and dogs. Every girl had only 8 minutes. The best team was Team Michael. The challenge prize was to decide who should be immune from the elimination. The girls opted for Giuliana. At elimination, Julia St, Leticia, Lynn, Maja and Soraya landed in the bottom five. In the end, Julia St. was eliminated.

Booked for job: Anh Phuong Dinh Phan,  Brenda Hübscher, Carina Zavline, Romina Brennecke, Sabine Fischer & Serlina Hohmann
Quit: Greta Faeser 
Challenge winner: Team Michael
Immune from elimination: Giuliana Radermacher
Bottom five: Julia Steyns, Leticia Wala-Ntuba, Lynn Petertonkoker, Maja Manczak & Soraya Eckes
Eliminated: Julia Steyns
Featured photographer: Thomas Patton
Special guests: Michael Costello

Episode 9: Boys! Boys! Boys! 

The week starts with a teaching about posing with boys. Leticia, Sabine and Soraya were booked for a casting and Sabine was booked for the job. This week's photoshoot was to pose with a male model wearing lingerie. At elimination, Brenda, Serlina and Soraya landed in the bottom three. In the end, Soraya was eliminated from the competition.
 
Booked for job: Sabine Fischer
Best photo: Leticia Wala-Ntuba
Bottom three: Brenda Hübscher, Serlina Hohmann & Soraya Eckes
Eliminated: Soraya Eckes
Featured photographer: Rankin
Special guests: Wolfgang Joop

Episode 10: Der Einzug in die Top 10 

This week's photoshoot was a fashion video shoot with Shaun Ross. Some of the girls did really well but others did not do so well. Anh, Leticia and Romina were booked for a casting and Leticia was booked for the job. At elimination, Brenda, Giuliana and Sabine landed in the bottom three. Sabine was safe, leaving Brenda and Giuliana in the bottom two. In the end, Giuliana was eliminated.

Booked for job: Leticia Wala-Ntuba  
Best video: Carina Zavline
Bottom three: Brenda Hübscher, Giuliana Radermacher & Sabine Fischer
Eliminated: Giuliana Radermacher
Featured director: Lance Drake
Special guests: Shaun Ross, Mac Folkes & Nikeata Thompson

Episode 11: Enthüllung: Die Models im Interview 
Original airdate: 

The week started with a teaching on how to behave at an interview. This week's photoshoot was posing in a big plastic bubble. Leticia and Lynn flew to New York City after being chosen by Heidi to go to the amfAR Gala. They did not come back because of a snowstorm in New York. That's why Heidi decided that Leticia and Lynn were secure from elimination. At elimination, Brenda was eliminated for her bad performance at photoshoot and runway. After Brenda's elimination, Anh and Sabine landed in the bottom two. But neither of them were eliminated.

Best photo: Serlina Hohmann
Immune from elimination: Leticia Wala-Ntuba & Lynn Petertonkoker
Eliminated: Brenda Hübscher
Bottom two: Anh Phuong Dinh Phan & Sabine Fischer
Eliminated: None 
Featured photographer: Markus Schäfer
Special guests: Julia Bauer, Patricia Riekel & Philipp Plein

Episode 12: Abgedreht: Als Alice im Puppenhäuschen 
Original airdate: 

This week's photoshoot was to pose as Alice from Alice in Wonderland. The girls had a casting for Opel Adam and Carina was booked for the job. At elimination, nobody was eliminated.

Booked for job: Carina Zavline 
Best photo: Lynn Petertonkoker
Eliminated: None
Featured photographer: Kimberley Gordon
Special guests: Giuseppe Fiordispina

Episode 13: Panik beim Unterwasser Shooting  
Original airdate: 

This week started with a casting for Gillette Venus and Céline was booked for the job. This week's photoshoot was to pose as underwater goddesses. At elimination, Sabine was eliminated for her bad performance at the shoot. Later, Anh and Romina landed in the bottom two. No one was eliminated, but both must have go to the Shoot out next week.

Booked for job: Céline Bethmann      
Best photo: Serlina Hohmann
Eliminated: Sabine Fischer
Bottom two: Anh Phuong Dinh Phan & Romina Brennecke  
Eliminated: None
Featured photographer: Peter Taras
Special guests: Patrick Karcher

Episode 14: Der Einzug ins Halbfinale 
Original airdate: 

The week started with a teaching about showing emotions. This week's photoshoot was to portraying emotions in B&W. After the photoshoot Heidi announced that Anh is out. At elimination, Carina and Serlina landed in the bottom two. In the end, Carina was eliminated.

Shoot out: Anh Phuong Dinh Phan & Romina Brennecke  
Eliminated outside of judging panel: Anh Phuong Dinh Phan
Best photo: Leticia Wala-Ntuba
Bottom two: Carina Zavline & Serlina Hohmann
Eliminated: Carina Zavline
Featured photographer: Yu Tsai
Special guests: Nina Franoszek & Philipp Plein

Episode 15: Das Halbfinale 
Original airdate: 

This week's photoshoot was the Cosmopolitian shoot. At elimination, Thomas and Michael had to decide who would not be in the final. Michael chose Romina and Thomas choose Lynn. After that was the final runway. Leticia was the first to reach the final and then Romina. After that Heidi decided that Lynn is not in the final, because she had not booked a job. After Lynn's elimination, Heidi announced that Céline is the third finalist. Then, Maja was the second eliminated, because she neither had received a job. After that Serlina became the fourth finalist.

Eliminated: Lynn Petertonkoker & Maja Manczak 
Featured photographer: 
Special guests: Anja Delastik

Episode 16: Das spektakuläre Finale 
Original airdate: 
  
The final started with a fashion show. Then followed the first decision. Leticia and Romina landed in the Walk-off and Leticia was the first eliminated. Then they had to prove again on the runway. After that, Romina was the second eliminated. The last task was a beauty shot in front of a black wall in pairs. After the final runway, Céline was declared the winner of Germany's Next Topmodel.

Final four: Céline Bethmann, Leticia Wala-Ntuba, Romina Brennecke & Serlina Hohmann
Walk-off: Leticia Wala-Ntuba & Romina Brennecke
Eliminated: Leticia Wala-Ntuba
Final three: Céline Bethmann, Romina Brennecke  & Serlina Hohmann
Eliminated: Romina Brennecke
All-Stars walk opener: Julia Fux
Final two: Céline Bethmann & Serlina Hohmann
Germany's Next Topmodel: Céline Bethmann
Featured photographer: Markus Schäfer
Special guests: Rebecca Mir, Robin Schulz, James Blunt, Wolfgang Joop, Naomi Campbell, Beth Ditto, Kim Hnizdo, Barbara Meier, Stefanie Giesinger, Helene Fischer

Summaries

Results table 

 
 The contestant was eliminated outside of judging panel
 The contestant withdrew from the competition
 The contestant was immune from elimination 
 The contestant won best photo 
 The contestant was in danger of elimination
 The contestant was eliminated
 The contestant won the competition

Photo shoot guide
Episode 2 photo shoot: Paddleboarding in bikinis
Episode 3 photo shoot: On a box in extreme heights
Episode 4 photo shoot: Sedcard  
Episode 5 photo shoot: Dirty in the desert
Episode 6 photo shoot: Burlesque Girls in Las Vegas
Episode 7 photo shoot: Graffiti bodypainting
Episode 8 photo shoot: Posing with their mentors and dogs in elegant dresses
Episode 9 photo shoot: On a bed with male models wearing lingerie
Episode 10 video shoot: Action fashion film with Shaun Ross
Episode 11 photo shoot: Posing in a plastic ball
Episode 12 photo shoot: Portraying 'Alice in Wonderland' in a little doll house
Episode 13 photo shoot: Underwater Goddesses
Episode 14 photo shoot: Portraying emotions in B&W
Episode 15 photo shoot: Cosmopolitan covers
Episode 16 photo shoot: Beauty shot in pairs

References

External links 
Official Website

Germany's Next Topmodel
2017 German television seasons
Television shows filmed in Spain
Television shows filmed in France
Television shows filmed in Los Angeles
Television shows filmed in New York City
Television shows shot in the Las Vegas Valley
Television shows shot in London